Nyurbinsky District (Ñurba uluuha ) is an administrative and municipal district (raion, or ulus), one of the thirty-four in the Sakha Republic, Russia. It is located in the central western part of the republic and borders with Olenyoksky District in the north, Verkhnevilyuysky District in the east, Suntarsky District in the south and southwest, and with Mirninsky District in the northwest. Its administrative center is the town of Nyurba. Population (excluding the administrative center):  15,549 (2002 Census);

Geography
The main rivers in the district are the Vilyuy and its tributaries the Markha and the Tyukyan.

Climate

History
The district was established on January 9, 1930.
Until February 1992, it was called Leninsky District.

Demographics
As of the 1989 Census, the ethnic composition was as follows:
Yakuts: 81.8%
Russians: 13.7%
Evens: 0.2%
Evenks: 0.2%
other ethnicities: 4.1%

Average age of the population is 29.

Economy
The economy of the district is mostly based on mining, food industry, forestry, light industry, and agriculture. Major natural resources include diamonds, gold, and brown coal. Diamond mining is mostly carried out by ALROSA company.

Transportation
The Vilyuy Highway runs through the district, connecting the town of Nyurba with Yakutsk, Vilyuysk, and Mirny.

Inhabited localities

Divisional source:

*Administrative centers are shown in bold

References

Notes

Sources

Districts of the Sakha Republic
States and territories established in 1930